TSV Windeck Germania is a German association football club from the municipality of Windeck in the district of Rhein-Sieg, North Rhine-Westphalia. It was formed through the merger in June 2009 of FC Germania Dattenfeld, 1. Windeck FC and TSV Dreisel. In addition to its football side, the club has departments for judo, tennis, women's gymnastics, and volleyball.

History

Predecessor FC Germania Dattenfeld was founded in 1910 and first came to note with the advance of its football side to the Landesliga Mittelrhein (VI) in 1999, where they captured the title in 2001 to win promotion to the Verbandsliga Mittelrhein (V). Germania continued to deliver strong performances, earning a vice championship in its debut season in fifth-tier play and a succession of upper-table finishes in subsequent seasons. In 2007 the club rose to the Oberliga Nordrhein (IV) on the strength of a Verbandsliga title. The rapid climb by the club out of Bezirksliga C-Klasse football is credited to Chairman Heinz Georg Willmeroth and his friend and the club's main sponsor, Franz-Josef Wernze.

Partners 1. Windeck FC and TSV Dreisel were both established in 1919 and have only ever played in lower-level local competition.

Currently the club plays in the tier five Oberliga Mittelrhein.

Honours
The club's honours:
 Verbandsliga Mittelrhein (V) 
 Champions: 2007
 Landesliga Mittelrhein I (VI)
 Champions: 2001
 Middle Rhine Cup
 Winners: 2009, 2010, 2011

Stadium
The club plays its home matches in the Germania Dattenfelder Sports Park which has a capacity of 1,000. A grandstand with seating for 150 is planned.

In August 2007 the club made headlines when, in the third match of the season, the goalkeeper of visiting SV Straelen noticed the crossbar was too low. A measurement showed the goal 14–17 cm lower than the required 2.44 m. Straelen officially protested their 0–4 loss but were initially denied. In November 2007, following an appeal of the original decision, the match was ordered replayed.

Notable coaches
 Hermann-Josef Werres
 Michael Boris

References

External links 
 Official website 
 Das deutsche Fußball-Archiv historical German domestic league tables (in German)

Football clubs in Germany
Football clubs in North Rhine-Westphalia
Association football clubs established in 1910
1910 establishments in Germany